Tetrafluoropropylene may refer to:

 1,3,3,3-Tetrafluoropropylene (HFO-1234ze)
 2,3,3,3-Tetrafluoropropylene (HFO-1234yf)

This is a Gaseous phase effluent from the decomposition of Teflon when laser cutting it.

References